Phoeniostacta is a monotypic moth genus in the subfamily Arctiinae. Its single species, Phoeniostacta haematobasis, is found in Santa Catarina, Brazil. Both the genus and species were first described by George Hampson in 1898.

References

Arctiinae